Grimwade is a family name of British origin which includes members of a prominent Australian family; it may refer to:

Sir Andrew Grimwade (born 1930), Australian chemical engineer, philanthropist and cattle breeder
Darren Grimwade (born 1980), Australian politician
Fred Grimwade (1933–1989), Australian politician
Frederick Sheppard Grimwade (1840–1910), Australian businessman and Victorian parliamentarian
Harold Grimwade (1869–1949), Australian Army officer
Peter Grimwade (1942–1990), British television writer and director
Philip Grimwade (1912–1961), Australian politician
Russell Grimwade (1879–1955) (Wilfrid Russell Grimwade), Australian chemist, botanist, industrialist and philanthropist.
Grimwade, Western Australia, a locality, formally known as East Kirup, located in south-West WA.

Etymology
The origin of the name Grimwade is derived of Anglo-Saxon origin, however its meaning remains a mystery.

Grim- derives from the Anglo-Saxon word Grimr or Grim, an Anglo-Saxon alias for the God of War and Magic, Wōden (referred to as Odin in Norse mythology) and meaning "the masked one". Whereas -wade likely derives from the Anglo-Saxon word wadan, meaning "to travel", "to go", or "to advance". However, -wade could also possibly derive from the Anglo-Saxon word ward, meaning "guardian", "protector", or "century". Therefore, Grimwade probably refers to the "traveling masked one", or "mysterious traveler" as Anglo-Saxon often attributes Grimr to mysterious phenomena, for example in naming Grim's Ditch. Alternatively, Grimwade is possibly an occupational name, referring to a "masked guardian".

See also
Grimwade House, Melbourne Grammar School, Australia